Rinnebach is a small river of Hesse, Germany. It springs north of Schwarzenborn. It flows into the Ohebach west of Homberg.

See also
List of rivers of Hesse

References

Rivers of Hesse
Rivers of Germany